Lydgate is a village in the civil parish of Saddleworth in the Metropolitan Borough of Oldham, in Greater Manchester, England. The village has a church and was historically a part of the West Riding of Yorkshire.

See also

Listed buildings in Saddleworth

Geography of the Metropolitan Borough of Oldham
Saddleworth
Villages in Greater Manchester